The Skill is the eighth studio album by the Australian band Sherbet but also the first under their new name, The Sherbs. It was released in October 1980 and reached at number 85 on the Kent Music Report.

The title track single, "I Have the Skill" peaked at No. 61 on the Billboard Hot 100 Charts in early 1981. It also peaked as high as No. 14 on the Billboard Mainstream Rock Charts.

Reception
Cash Box magazine said "The revitalised fivesome plays a nifty brand of modern power pop that should please both Top 40 and AOR programmers. Best cuts are 'I Have the Skill' and 'Cindy's Waiting'".

Track listing

Personnel
 Tony Mitchell – bass guitar
 Garth Porter – keyboards
 Daryl Braithwaite – vocals
 Alan Sandow – drums
 Harvey James – guitar

Charts

Release history

References 

Sherbet (band) albums
1980 albums
Atco Records albums
Festival Records albums
Infinity Records albums
Albums produced by Richard Lush